Palsy is a medical term which refers to various types of paralysis<ref name="Agin">Dan Agin, More Than Genes: What Science Can Tell Us About Toxic Chemicals, Development, and the Risk to Our Children;; (2009), p. 172.</ref> or paresis, often accompanied by weakness and the loss of feeling and uncontrolled body movements such as shaking. The word originates from the Anglo-Norman paralisie, parleisie et al., from the accusative form of Latin paralysis, from Ancient Greek παράλυσις (parálusis), from παραλύειν (paralúein, “to disable on one side”), from παρά (pará, “beside”) + λύειν (lúein, “loosen”). The word is longstanding in the English language, having appeared in the play Grim the Collier of Croydon'', reported to have been written as early as 1599: 

In some editions, the Bible passage of Luke 5:18 is translated to refer to "a man which was taken with a palsy". More modern editions simply refer to a man who is paralysed. Although the term has historically been associated with paralysis generally, "is now almost always used in connection to the word 'cerebral'—meaning the brain".

Specific kinds of palsy include:
Bell's palsy, partial facial paralysis
Bulbar palsy, impairment of cranial nerves
Cerebral palsy, a neural disorder caused by intracranial lesions
Conjugate gaze palsy, a disorder affecting the ability to move the eyes 
Erb's palsy, also known as brachial palsy, involving paralysis of an arm
Spinal muscular atrophy, also known as wasting palsy
Progressive supranuclear palsy, a degenerative disease
Squatter's palsy, a common name for bilateral peroneal nerve palsy that may be triggered by sustained squatting
Third nerve palsy, involving cranial nerve III

References

External links

Medical terminology